Martin Tore Bjørndal (27 April 1944 − 11 April 2015) was a Norwegian diplomat.

He was born in Ulsteinvik. He graduated from the University of Oslo with the cand.philol. degree in 1972, and started working in the Norwegian Ministry of Foreign Affairs in 1973. He was the Norwegian ambassador to Chile for a period before returning to the Ministry of Foreign Affairs. In 1999 he was decorated as a Knight of the Royal Norwegian Order of Merit.

In May 2004 he was appointed as Norway's ambassador to Venezuela. His responsibility was extended to Colombia in January 2005, Haiti from February 2005, Ecuador from February 2005, and the Dominican Republic in March 2006. In June 2008 he was moved back to Chile. In November 2008 his Chilean ambassadorship was extended to Peru.

References

1944 births
2015 deaths
People from Ulstein
University of Oslo alumni
Norwegian civil servants
Ambassadors of Norway to Chile
Ambassadors of Norway to Venezuela
Ambassadors of Norway to Colombia
Ambassadors of Norway to Haiti
Ambassadors of Norway to Ecuador
Ambassadors of Norway to the Dominican Republic
Ambassadors of Norway to Peru